Euphenics, which literally means "good appearance" or "normal appearing", is the science of making phenotypic improvements to humans after birth, generally to affect a problematic genetic condition.

Overview
In the early 1960s, Joshua Lederberg invented the term euphenics to differentiate the practice from eugenics, which was widely unpopular at the time.  He emphasized that the genetic manipulation he described was intended to work on phenotype rather than genotype; he felt it was more feasible to positively change an individual's genetics rather than attempt to change the course of evolution as eugenics proposed.  Theodosius Dobzhansky, an outspoken proponent of euphenics, argued that by improving genetic conditions so that people could live normal, healthy lives, people could lessen the impact of genetic conditions, thus lowering future interest in eugenics or other kinds of genetic manipulation.

In the 1970s, considerable effort was put towards the developing field of euphenics since it was seen as a positive form of genetic engineering.  One of the first publicized applications of euphenics was the use of vitamins containing folic acid during pregnancy to combat neural-tube deficiencies such as spina bifida in the 1970s. However, medical science had been using euphenic strategies years before the term itself was coined. Euphenics is used today in the medical community to more generally refer to methods of affecting a genetic condition in a positive manner through diet, lifestyle or environment, such as the use of insulin to control diabetes or installation of a pacemaker to offset a heart defect.

References

Applied genetics